Lactifluus corrugis (formerly Lactarius corrugis), commonly known as the corrugated-cap milky, is an edible species of fungus in the family Russulaceae. It was first described by American mycologist Charles Horton Peck in 1880.

Description
Along with Lactifluus volemus, L. corrugis is considered a choice edible mushroom. The latex of both species stains brown.

See also
List of Lactifluus species

References

corrugis
Edible fungi
Fungi described in 1880
Fungi of North America
Taxa named by Charles Horton Peck